The Siberian Elm cultivar Ulmus pumila 'Zhonghua Jinye' is an introduction from China.

Description
'Jinye' forms a dense, rounded shrub bearing soft yellow foliage.

Pests and diseases
See under Ulmus pumila.

Cultivation
The cultivar was introduced to China in 2014; it is not yet known beyond that country.

Accessions
None known.

Nurseries
None known.

References

Siberian elm cultivar
Ulmus articles missing images
Ulmus